The 27th British Academy Scotland Awards were held on 5 November 2017 at the Radisson Blu Hotel in Glasgow, honouring the best Scottish film and television productions of 2017. The nominees were announced on 4 October 2017. The ceremony was hosted by Edith Bowman.

Nominees

Winners are listed first and highlighted in boldface.

Outstanding Contribution to Film & Television
Armando Iannucci

Outstanding Contribution to Craft
Doug Allan

See also
70th British Academy Film Awards
89th Academy Awards
23rd Screen Actors Guild Awards

References

External links
BAFTA Scotland Home page

2017
2017 in British cinema
British Academy Scotland Awards
British Academy Scotland Awards
2017 in Scotland
2017 in British television
Brit
November 2017 events in the United Kingdom
2010s in Glasgow